Emil Bergkvist (born 17 June 1994) is a Swedish rally driver. He has competed in the World Rally Championship since 2015.

Bergkvist is the 2018 Junior World Rally Champion and the 2015 Junior European Rally Champion.

Career results

WRC results

As driver

As co-driver

WRC-2 results

WRC-3 results

As driver

As co-driver

JWRC results

ERC results

ERC Junior results

Notes

References

Living people
1994 births
Swedish rally drivers
World Rally Championship drivers
Place of birth missing (living people)
Peugeot Sport drivers
Saintéloc Racing drivers
Dakar Rally co-drivers